The Revolt of Tyre was an anti-Fatimid rebellion by the populace of the city of Tyre, in modern Lebanon. It began in 996, when the people, led by an ordinary sailor named 'Allaqa, rose up against the Fatimid government. The Fatimid caliph al-Hakim bi-Amr Allah sent his army and navy to retake the city under Abu Abdallah al-Husayn ibn Nasir al-Dawla and the freedman Yaqut. Based in the nearby cities of Tripoli and Sidon, the Fatimid forces blockaded Tyre by land and sea for two years, during which a Byzantine squadron's attempt to reinforce the defenders was repulsed by the Fatimid navy with heavy losses. In the end, Tyre fell in May 998 and was plundered and its defenders either massacred or taken captive to Egypt, where 'Allaqa was flayed alive and crucified, while many of his followers, as well as 200 Byzantine captives, were executed.

See also
 10th century in Lebanon
 Mardaite revolts

Sources
 
 
 

990s conflicts
10th-century rebellions
10th century in the Fatimid Caliphate
Tyre
Rebellions against the Fatimid Caliphate
History of Tyre, Lebanon
Tyre
996
997
998
Syria under the Fatimid Caliphate